One Way to Love is a 1946 American comedy film starring Willard Parker and Chester Morris. It was directed by Ray Enright.

Plot

References

External links

1946 films
1940s English-language films
Films directed by Ray Enright
American comedy films
1946 comedy films
American black-and-white films
1940s American films
English-language comedy films